The Negro Family: The Case For National Action, commonly known as the Moynihan Report, was a 1965 report on black poverty in the United States written by Daniel Patrick Moynihan, an American scholar serving as Assistant Secretary of Labor under President Lyndon B. Johnson and later to become a US Senator. Moynihan argued that the rise in black single-mother families was caused not by a lack of jobs, but by a destructive vein in ghetto culture, which could be traced to slavery times and continued discrimination in the American South under Jim Crow. 

Black sociologist E. Franklin Frazier had introduced that idea in the 1930s, but Moynihan was considered one of the first academics to defy conventional social-science wisdom about the structure of poverty. As he wrote later, "The work began in the most orthodox setting, the US Department of Labor, to establish at some level of statistical conciseness what 'everyone knew': that economic conditions determine social conditions. Whereupon, it turned out that what everyone knew was evidently not so." The report concluded that the high rate of families headed by single mothers would greatly hinder progress of blacks toward economic and political equality. The Moynihan Report was criticized by liberals at the time of publication, and its conclusions remain controversial.

Background
While writing The Negro Family: The Case For National Action, Moynihan was employed in a political appointee position at the US Department of Labor, hired to help develop policy for the Johnson administration in its War on Poverty. In the course of analyzing statistics related to black poverty, Moynihan noticed something unusual: Rates of black male unemployment and welfare enrollment, instead of running parallel as they always had, started to diverge in 1962 in a way that would come to be called "Moynihan's scissors."

When Moynihan published his report in 1965, the out-of-wedlock birthrate among blacks was 25 percent, much higher than that of whites.

Contents 
In the introduction to his report, Moynihan said that "the gap between the Negro and most other groups in American society is widening." He also said that the collapse of the nuclear family in the black lower class would preserve the gap between possibilities for Negroes and other groups and favor other ethnic groups. He acknowledged the continued existence of racism and discrimination within society, despite the victories that blacks had won by civil rights legislation.

Moynihan concluded, "The steady expansion of welfare programs can be taken as a measure of the steady disintegration of the Negro family structure over the past generation in the United States."

More than 30 years later, S. Craig Watkins described Moynihan's conclusions: Representing: Hip Hop Culture and the Production of Black Cinema (1998):
The report concluded that the structure of family life in the black community constituted a 'tangle of pathology... capable of perpetuating itself without assistance from the white world,' and that 'at the heart of the deterioration of the fabric of Negro society is the deterioration of the Negro family. It is the fundamental source of the weakness of the Negro community at the present time.' Also, the report argued that the matriarchal structure of black culture weakened the ability of black men to function as authority figures. That particular notion of black familial life has become a widespread, if not dominant, paradigm for comprehending the social and economic disintegration of late 20th-century black urban life.

Influence 
 
The Moynihan Report generated considerable controversy and has had long-lasting and important influence. Writing to Lyndon Johnson, Moynihan argued that without access to jobs and the means to contribute meaningful support to a family, black men would become systematically alienated from their roles as husbands and fathers, which would cause rates of divorce, child abandonment and out-of-wedlock births to skyrocket in the black community (a trend that had already begun by the mid-1960s), leading to vast increases in the numbers of households headed by females.

Moynihan made a contemporaneous argument for programs for jobs, vocational training, and educational programs for the black community. Modern scholars of the 21st century, including Douglas Massey, believe that the report was one of the more influential in the construction of the War on Poverty.

In 2009 historian Sam Tanenhaus wrote that Moynihan's fights with the New Left over the report were a signal that Great Society liberalism had political challengers both from the right and from the left.

Reception and following debate 
From the time of its publication, the report has been sharply attacked by black and civil rights leaders as examples of white patronizing, cultural bias, or racism. At various times, the report has been condemned or dismissed by the NAACP and other civil rights groups and leaders such as Jesse Jackson and Al Sharpton. Critics accused Moynihan of relying on stereotypes of the black family and black men, implying that blacks had inferior academic performance, portrayed crime and pathology as endemic to the black community and failing to recognize that cultural bias and racism in standardized tests had contributed to apparent lower achievement by blacks in school. The report was criticized for threatening to undermine the place of civil rights on the national agenda, leaving "a vacuum that could be filled with a politics that blamed Blacks for their own troubles."

In 1987, Hortense Spillers, a black feminist academic, criticized the Moynihan Report on semantic grounds for its use of "matriarchy" and "patriarchy" when he described the African-American family. She argues that the terminology used to define white families cannot be used to define African-American families because of the way slavery has affected the African-American family.

Scholar Roderick Ferguson traced the effects of the Moynihan Report in his book Aberrations in Black, noting that black nationalists disagreed with the report’s suggestion that the state provide black men with masculinity, but agreed that men needed to take back the role of the patriarch. Ferguson argued that the Moynihan Report generated hegemonic discourses about minority communities and nationalist sentiments in the Black community. Ferguson uses the discourse of the Moynihan Report to inform his Queer of Color Critique, which attempts to resist national discourse while acknowledging a simultaneity of oppression through coalition building.

African-American libertarian economist and writer Walter E. Williams has praised the report for its findings. He has also said, "The solutions to the major problems that confront many black people won't be found in the political arena, especially not in Washington or state capitols." Thomas Sowell, an African-American libertarian economist as well, has also praised the Moynihan Report on several occasions. His 1982 book Race and Economics mentions Moynihan's report, and in 1998 he asserted that the report "may have been the last honest government report on race." In 2015 Sowell argued that time had proved correct Moynihan's core idea that African-American poverty was less a result of racism and more a result of single-parent families: "One key fact that keeps getting ignored is that the poverty rate among black married couples has been in single digits every year since 1994."

Political commentator Heather Mac Donald wrote for National Review in 2008, "Conservatives of all stripes routinely praise Daniel Patrick Moynihan's prescience for warning in 1965 that the breakdown of the black family threatened the achievement of racial equality. They rightly blast those liberals who denounced Moynihan's report."

Sociologist Stephen Steinberg argued in 2011 that the Moynihan report was condemned "because it threatened to derail the Black liberation movement."

Attempting to divert responsibility

Psychologist William Ryan coined the phrase "blaming the victim" in his 1971 book Blaming the Victim, specifically as a critique of the Moynihan report. He said that it was an attempt to divert responsibility for poverty from social structural factors to the behaviors and cultural patterns of the poor.

Feminist critique
Some feminists argue the Moynihan Report presents a "male-centric" view of social problems. They believe that Moynihan failed to take into account basic rational incentives for marriage, and that he did not acknowledge that women had historically engaged in marriage in part out of need for material resources, as adequate wages were otherwise denied by cultural traditions excluding women from most jobs outside the home. With the expansion of welfare in the US in the mid to late 20th century, women gained better access to government resources intended to reduce family and child poverty. Women also increasingly gained access to the workplace. As a result, more women were able to subsist independently when men had difficulty finding work.

Counter-response 

Declaring Moynihan "prophetic," Ken Auletta, in his 1982 The Underclass, proclaimed that "one cannot talk about poverty in America, or about the underclass, without talking about the weakening family structure of the poor." Both the Baltimore Sun and the New York Times ran a series on the black family in 1983, followed by a 1985 Newsweek article called "Moynihan: I Told You So." In 1986, CBS aired the documentary The Vanishing Family, hosted by Bill Moyers, a onetime aide to President Johnson, which affirmed Moynihan's findings.

In a 2001 interview with PBS, Moynihan said:
My view is we had stumbled onto a major social change in the circumstances of post-modern society. It was not long ago in this past century that an anthropologist working in London – a very famous man at the time, Malinowski – postulated what he called the first rule of anthropology: That in all known societies, all male children have an acknowledged male parent. That's what we found out everywhere.... And well, maybe it's not true anymore. Human societies change.By the time of that interview, rates of the number of children born to single mothers had gone up in the white and Hispanic working classes as well. In November 2016, the Current Population Survey of the United States Census Bureau reported that 69 percent of children under the age of 18 lived with two parents, which was a decline from 88 percent in 1960, while the percentage of U.S. children under 18 living with one parent increased from 9 percent (8 percent with mothers, 1 percent with fathers) to 27 percent (23 percent with mothers, 4 percent with fathers).

See also

 African-American family structure
 Black matriarchy
 Fragile Families and Child Wellbeing Study
 Is Marriage for White People?
 William Julius Wilson

References

Further reading
 Aksamit, Daniel. "How the pathology became tangled: Daniel Patrick Moynihan and the liberal explanation of poverty since the 1960s." PS: Political Science & Politics 50.2 (2017): 374-378.

 Averbeck, Robin Marie. (2015) "The Good Old Liberals," Jacobin Magazine, recounts critiques of the Moynihan Report by Civil Rights leaders and provides a Left response to recurring 'nostalgia' for Moynihan in the press.
Ferguson, Roderick A. (2004)  Aberrations in Black: Toward a Queer of Color Critique University of Minnesota Press. In chapter 4, Ferguson analyzes the Moynihan Report as a coalition of sociological canons, black nationalism, the civil rights movement, neoconservative resentment, and neo-racist tendencies to initiate a trend that sought to reaffirm heteropatriarchal normativity
 Hymowitz, Kay S. (Summer 2005) "The Black Family: 40 Years of Lies"," City Journal, argues that early rejection of the Moynihan Report caused untold, needless misery in inner city communities.
 Geary, Daniel. "Racial Liberalism, the Moynihan Report, and the Daedalus Project on 'The Negro American'," Daedalus, 140 (Winter 2011), 53–66.
 Geary, Daniel.  Beyond Civil Rights: The Moynihan Report and Its Legacy (University of Pennsylvania Press, 2015).
 Geary, Daniel. " 'Racial self-help' or 'Blaming the Victim' ", Salon, 19 July 2015 
 Klass, Gary, Book review of William Ryan's Blaming the Victim (1976): , 1995
 Kristol, Irving (August 1971). "The Best of Intentions, the Worst of Results", The Atlantic, discusses Moynihan and his critics
 Massey, Douglas S., and Robert J. Sampson, "Moynihan Redux: Legacies and Lessons", Annals of the American Academy of Political and Social Science, 621 (Jan. 2009), 6–27.
 Patterson, James T. Freedom Is Not Enough: The Moynihan Report and America's Struggle Over Black Family Life From LBJ to Obama (Basic Books; 2010)
 Wilson, William Julius, "The Moynihan Report and Research on the Black Community", Annals of the American Academy of Political and Social Science, 621 (Jan. 2009), 34–46.

External links
 An annotated version of the report from The Atlantic
 Office of Policy Planning and Research, United States Department of Labor (March 1965) "The Negro Family: The Case For National Action" – Moynihan Report, hosted by Department of Labor, 1965

African-American documents
Black studies publications
Works about families
1965 documents
African-American gender relations
Politics and race in the United States